The Dutch cricket team toured Zimbabwe in September and October 2017 to play three List A matches. The Netherlands played as Royal Netherlands Cricket Board XI (KNCB XI). Previously, Zimbabwe had toured the Netherlands, also playing three List A matches, in June 2017. Zimbabwe won the series 2–1.

Squads

Fixtures

1st match

2nd match

3rd match

References

External links
 Series home at ESPN Cricinfo

2017 in Dutch cricket
2017 in Zimbabwean cricket
International cricket competitions in 2017–18
Zimbabwe
International cricket tours of Zimbabwe